Coloplast A/S is a Danish multinational company that develops, manufactures and markets medical devices and services related to ostomy, urology, continence, and wound care.

History
Coloplast was founded in 1957 by Aage Louis-Hansen. His son Niels Peter Louis-Hansen owns 20% of the company and is deputy chairman. It employs more than 12,000 people and operates around the world, with sales activities in 53 countries and production in Denmark, Hungary, France, China and the US. It has its global headquarters in Humlebæk, Denmark.  Its United States operations and North American headquarters are based in Minneapolis, Minnesota. The company manufactures and supplies products to hospitals and institutions, as well as wholesalers and retailers. In selected markets, Coloplast is a direct supplier to consumers.

The company had revenues of DKK 18.554 billion in 2020/2021. Europe constitutes the biggest market with 63% of sales, while 22% of sales are in North America and 15% in the rest of the world. Coloplast is listed on the Danish Stock Exchange, and has for a number of years been represented among the 20 most traded shares in the country.

In 2016, Coloplast was listed as the 22nd most innovative company in the world by Forbes Forbes. In 2015, Coloplast was listed as the 33rd most innovative company in the world by Forbes Magazine. The company has been featured in The Star Tribune's annual list of top employers in Minnesota.

In November 2021, Coloplast announces the acquisition for 2.5 billion dollars of Atos Medical, specialized in laryngectomy, which belonged to PAI Partners.

Acquisitions 
In 2010, the company acquired Mpathy Medical Devices.

In November 2016, Coloplast acquired Comfort Medical for $160 million. Comfort Medical was a direct-to-consumer medical supplier based in Coral Springs, Florida. Prior to the acquisition from Coloplast, Comfort Medical had acquired Medical Direct Club as well as Liberty Medical's urological business area in 2015. In 2020, Coloplast announced the acquisitions of Hope Medical and Rocky Medical Supply, and integrated the organizations into Comfort Medical.

In November 2021, Coloplast announced it would acquire Atos Medical and its laryngectomy technology for 2.16 billion euros ($2.49 billion).

Transvaginal surgical mesh lawsuits
In 2019, the U.S. Food and Drug Administration ordered Coloplast and Boston Scientific to halt the sale and distribution of transvaginal surgical mesh implants, for failure to prove their mesh products were safe and effective for the repair of pelvic organ prolapse. Coloplast was one of several companies that had previously settled multimillion-dollar lawsuits for damages caused by transvaginal mesh implants.

References

External links 

Companies listed on Nasdaq Copenhagen
Health care companies of Denmark
Companies based in Fredensborg Municipality
Danish companies established in 1957
Danish brands
Medical technology companies of Denmark